John Seddon is a British occupational psychologist and author, specialising in change in the service industry.  He is the managing director of Vanguard, a consultancy company he formed in 1985 and the inventor of 'The Vanguard Method'. Vanguard currently operates in eleven countries.  Seddon is a visiting professor at Buckingham University Business School.

Seddon's prominence grew following attacks on current British management thinking including the belief in economies of scale, quality standards such as ISO9000 and much of public sector reform including "deliverology", the use of targets, inspection and centralised control of local services. The Daily Telegraph described him as a "reluctant management guru", with a background in occupational psychology.

He is critical of target-based management, and of basing decisions on economies of scale, rather than "economies of flow".

Seddon has published seven books. In his 2008 book, Systems Thinking in the Public Sector, he provided a criticism of the UK Government reform programme and advocated its replacement by systems thinking. His book The Whitehall Effect was published on 5 November 2014. In it he articulates a more productive role for government in public-sector reform. His latest book, Beyond Command and Control was published on 30 September 2019 and promises to expose the inherent fallacies contained within command and control management.

Seddon won the first Management Innovation Prize for 'Reinventing Leadership' in October 2010.

Academia

John Seddon earned a BSc (Hons) in Psychology with the
University of Wales in 1974, and graduated with a MSc in
occupational psychology from the University of London in
1977.

Debate about local government management
An opinion piece on the deleterious effects of inspection regimes prompted discussion on the Local Government Chronicle (LGC) website with David Walker, Managing Director, Communications & Reporting, at the Audit Commission.

The debate was also covered in newspapers including The Times, which featured it on 31 July 2009.

Campaign 
Seddon wrote an open letter dated 31 January 2011 calling for the Rt. Hon Iain Duncan Smith and Lord Freud, the ministers responsible for Welfare Reform, to "halt the current programme of reorganisation associated with the Single Universal Credit and embark on a better course". In the letter, he says "This campaign is not about the concept of the Single Universal Credit as such. It is about the design and implementation of its delivery". He says the weakness in the proposals for online and call centre delivery of the new Single Universal Credit is the "continuing unquestioning faith in economies of scale". A petition was started on the Government e-petitions site  as part of the campaign on 18 August 2011. The petition calls for Iain Duncan Smith to rethink the centralised IT-dominated service design of Universal Credit.

References

External links
Memorandum by Professor John Seddon, submitted to HM Parliament Public Administration Committee January 2003
 Written evidence submitted by Vanguard Consulting on Universal Credit Implementation to the House of Commons Work and Pensions Select Committee September 2012

Living people
British psychologists
British systems scientists
Alumni of the University of London
Year of birth missing (living people)